Public education—from primary education through college—is open to every Saudi citizen. The second largest governmental spending in Saudi Arabia goes for education. Saudi Arabia spends 8.8% of its gross domestic product on education, which is nearly double the global average of 4.6%. Islamic studies are part of the education system alongside scientific and social studies that vary from educational institution to another.

Before 1957, when King Saud University was founded, many Saudi Arabians immigrated to other countries to attend universities.

Background
Saudi education is noted for its religious content. As of 2016, religious studies average a total of nine periods a week at the primary school level, compared to an average about 23 periods a week total for mathematics, science (physics, chemistry, biology and geology), social studies, Arabic language, English language and physical education.   At the university level, nearly two-thirds of graduates are women.

The education system was also criticized in the 1980s and 1990s for "poorly trained teachers, low retention rates, lack of rigorous standards, weak scientific and technical instruction", despite generous budgets, that have compelled the kingdom to depend on large numbers of expatriates workers to fill technical and administrative positions.
 Cultural  theology has also historically held influence over women's education in Saudi Arabia as well. By 2019, however, the Saudi embassy in the U.S. noted that "While the study of Islam remains at its core, the modern Saudi educational system also provides quality instruction in diverse fields of arts and sciences."

Education management system

Education is free at all levels. The education system in Saudi Arabia is primarily under the jurisdiction of the Ministry of Education and the Technical and Vocational Training Corporation (TVTC). Other authorities such as the Ministry of Defense and Aviation, the Presidency of the National Guard, and the Ministry of the Interior provide their affiliates and children with education at all levels, consistent with Ministry of Education guidelines. The highest authority that supervises education in Saudi Arabia is the Supreme Committee for Educational Policy, established in 1963.

According to the World Bank database, public spending on education is 6.8 percent of GDP, and public spending on education as a percentage of government expenditure was 27.6 percent in 2004. Education spending as a percentage of overall spending tripled from 1970 to 2000, and neither economic growth nor the price of oil had much impact on this trend.

The Ministry of Education developed The Ministry of Education Ten–Year Plan 1425–1435, which set the following goals:
 The education of 4- to 6-year-old children and the consideration of kindergarten as an independent stage as compared with other educational stages in terms of its buildings and syllabi
 Accommodation of all age categories from 6 to 18 years old at various stages of education
 Deepening the spirit of loyalty and pride of the country through intellectual awareness of Saudi Arabia's national issues
 Preparing students academically and culturally at the local and international levels to be able to achieve advanced international posts in the fields of mathematics and science for various age categories, taking into account International tests' standards
 Organization of girls' technical education
 Development of an educational system for students with special needs
 Development and growth of educational and administrative training for the Ministry's personnel
 Improvement of internal and external sufficiency for the educational system
 Development of syllabi based on Islamic values leading to the development of male and female students' personality and to their integration in society as well as to the achievement of scientific and thinking skills and life characteristics resulting in self-education and lifelong learning
 To improve the quality of male and female teachers and to increase the citizens' rate in the education sector to achieve the full use of Saudi human resources
 To develop the educational structure and to update the school map to meet the expected quantitative and qualitative changes in the next stage
 To develop the infrastructure of information and communication technology and its employment in education and learning
 To develop male and female adults' education and to eradicate illiteracy
 The Ministry's comprehensive administrative development
 Expansion of social participation in education
 To establish integrated systems for accountability

Pre-primary education
In Saudi Arabia, children aged 3–5 years go to kindergarten. However, attendance of kindergartens is not a prerequisite for enrollment of first grade of primary education and kindergartens are not part of the official education ladder. Some private numbers have been established with technical and financial first aid-kit from the government.
According to government data, 100,714 children (51,364 male and 49,350 female) were in pre-primary education in 2007. The gross enrollment percentage was 10.8%, for boys 11.1 percent and for girls 10.4 percent.

Intermediate and secondary education
Intermediate education in Saudi Arabia lasts three years.
According to government data, 1,144,548 students (609,300 male and 535,248 female) were in intermediate education in 2007 and the number of teachers totaled 108,065 (54,034 male and 54,031 female) in 2007. According to gross enrollment the total rate was 95.9 percent in 2007.

Secondary education in Saudi Arabia lasts three years and this is the final stage of general education. After the intermediate education, students have the opportunity for both general and specialized secondary education. Technical secondary institute which provide technical and vocational education and training programs lasts three years in the fields of industry, commerce and agriculture.

According to government data, 1,013,074 students (541,849 male and 471,225 female) were in secondary education in 2007 and the number of teachers totaled 87,823 (41,108 male and 46,715 female) in 2007.

As of 2007, gross enrollment rates were 91.8% in secondary education.

Post-secondary/higher education
Investment in higher education has outstripped the western world in some cases.

Higher education in Saudi Arabia lasts four years in the field of humanities and social sciences, and five to six years in the field of medicine, engineering and pharmacy. The establishment of the King Saud University in 1957 was the starting point of the modern higher education system in Saudi Arabia. This was also the first university in all the Arab states of the Arabian Gulf.

There are 24 government universities in Saudi Arabia, established in a short span of time. Among them, Taibah University, Qassim University and Taif University were established under the Seventh Development Plan. The universities consists of colleges and departments that offer diplomas, and bachelor's, master's and PhD degrees in various scientific and humanities specializations. Some colleges and departments also provide distance learning. There also exist private colleges, community colleges affiliated to universities, and girls colleges, in addition to government agencies and institutions that provide specialist university-level education.

According to a World Bank report, more than 70 percent of the students in Saudi Arabia are in the fields of humanities and social sciences, a figure similar to that of other Arab countries, like Djibouti, Egypt, Morocco, Oman, United Arab Emirates, and West Bank and Gaza

According to government data, a total of 636,245 (268,080 male and 368,165 female) students were enrolled in higher education in 2006. Among them, 528,146 students (187,489 male and 340,657 female) were in Bachelor programs, 9,768 students (5,551 male and 4,217 female) were in Master programs, and 2,410 students (1,293 male and 1,117 female) were in Ph.D. programs. Another 93,968 students (72,199 male and 21,769 female) were in Intermediate Diploma courses and 1,953 students (1,548 male and 405 female) were in Higher Diploma course. According to the World Bank, in 2006 the gross enrollment ratio for females was 36.1 percent, the gross enrollment ratio for males was 24.7 percent, and the total gross enrollment ratio was 30.2 percent.

In 2005, King Abdullah implemented a government scholarship program to send young Saudi nationals to Western universities for undergraduate and postgraduate studies. The program offers funds for tuition and living expenses for up to four years. An estimated 5,000 Saudi students received government scholarships to study abroad for the 2007/2008 academic year. Students mostly studied at universities in Canada, the United States, the United Kingdom, Australia, New Zealand, Switzerland, France, and Germany.

The universities in the United Kingdom which provide distance learning in Saudi Arabia include the University of Leicester. It has ranked in the top 1% of universities in the world by THE World University Rankings.

In the United Kingdom alone, more than 15,000 Saudi students, 25% of whom are women, attend universities. The large number of students also includes Saudis paying their own tuition. The large influx of Saudi students to the United Kingdom prompted the Saudi Ministry of Higher Education in 2010 to close access to the country for further study.

Girls' and women's education

In 1957, the Dar al-Hanan and Nassif private schools for girls opened in the city of Jeddah. The openings were prompted by Iffat, the wife of Faisal of Saudi Arabia. Afterwards the Saudi government began opening state-operated girls schools. Religious fundamentalists protested the openings of the schools. In 1963 King Faisal brought soldiers to control protesters when a girls' school opened in Buraydah. During Saudi Arabia's first oil boom many Saudi males who studied abroad brought foreign wives back to Saudi Arabia. This caused concern among Saudi fathers with daughters eligible for marriage. In the late 1970s the Saudi government greatly increased university spots for women as a way of slowly progressing and not to clash with traditional culture at the time.

The General Administration of Girls' Education (also called the General Presidency for Girls' Education) was established independently from the Ministry of Education when girls education was started in Saudi Arabia 1960. Girls education was put under the control of a separate administration controlled by conservative clerics as "a compromise to calm public opposition to allowing (not requiring) girls to attend school".

60% of university students in Saudi Arabia are Saudi females. In Saudi Arabia, women in the labor force are mainly in the education sector. The first group of women graduated from a law program in 2008. On 6 October 2013, the first four women received their legal licences to practice law, not only as legal consultants but as lawyers in courtrooms and before the Saudi judiciary.

According to the World Bank report, female students in higher education in Saudi Arabia outnumber those in Jordan, Tunisia and West Bank and Gaza.

According to the World Bank, gross enrollment rate for female is 36.1 percent, gross enrollment rate for male is 24.7 percent, and gross enrollment rate for total was 30.2 percent in 2006. There are thousands of female professors throughout Saudi Arabia.

Around 2009, an expert on girls' education became the first woman minister in Saudi Arabia. Nora bint Abdullah al-Fayez, a US-educated former teacher, was made deputy education minister in charge of a new department for female students. In addition, Saudi Arabia provides female students with one of the world's largest scholarship programs. By this program, thousands of women have earned doctorates from Western universities.

The building of colleges and universities for women, which was recently announced by the government, is critically important. Women constitute 60% of Saudi Arabia's college students but only 21% of its labor force, much lower than in neighboring countries. 85% of employed Saudi women work in education, 6% in public health, and 95% in the public sector. Princess Nora bint Abdul Rahman University (PNU) is the first women's university in Saudi Arabia and largest women-only university in the world, composed of 32 campuses across the Riyadh region.

According to the Saudi Ministry of Education, Saudi women’s undergraduate enrollment rates surpassed those of men in 2015, with women comprising 52 percent of all university students in the kingdom.

Private education
In Saudi Arabia, private education is to be considered one of the elements supporting governmental education at all education levels. The General Department for Private Education at the Ministry of Education supervises private schools for boys and private schools for girls and government provides private schools with free textbooks and an annual financial aid. Government also appoints and pays for a qualified director in every private school.
According to UNESCO, in 2007, 48.9 percent of children enrolled in pre-primary schools, and 8.2 percent of children enrolled in primary school. As for the intermediate education, 6.4 percent of students enrolled in general programs were in private schools and 70.3 percent of students enrolled in technical and vocational programs were in private schools. As for the secondary education, 13.4 percent of students enrolled in general programs were in private schools and 61.6 percent of students enrolled in technical and vocational programs were in private schools. According to the World Bank, in 2004, 7.4 percent of students in tertiary education enrolled in private schools.

Before 2018, a large number of private schools (including international and foreign ones) were run in rented villas or buildings in several cities of the country. In April 2004, Asharq Al-Awsat reported that the education ministry crafted a plan to get rid of schools functioning in rented buildings by 2011. Several columnists and parents frequently expressed their displeasure and grievances regarding schools being run in villas and often asked the Saudi education authorities implement stringent rules for the same. In May 2013, the education ministry updated rules and regulations for schools operating in leased villas, instructing institution's authorities to ensure the premises strictly adhere to the building code and added that building owners and real estate companies were required to obtain approval prior to renting the premises to schools. In September 2013, Arab News reported that around 35% of the schools in Saudi Arabia were being operated in villa-turned campus buildings.

In June 2016, the education ministry led by Dr. Ahmed al-Issa stopped issuing licenses to private schools that didn't have infrastructure designed for educational purposes and asked investors and stakeholders to shift their schools to educational buildings by 2018. In 2017, the education ministry announced that it would be closing down all the schools operating in rented buildings in Saudi Arabia despite the two year deadline, prompting severe reactions from owners and investors which forced the ministry to review and subsequently rescind its decision. In May 2018, after reaching the deadline, the Saudi authorities closed down 113 schools across the country after they failed to shift their premises to buildings designed for educational purposes.

International education
Saudi Arabia hosts almost 9 million foreign workers of various nationalities as of 2013, mostly from underdeveloped Asian and African countries. The Saudi government has granted permission to the diplomatic missions of the respective countries to operate community-based schools in the country to cater the educational needs of their children. According to the International Schools Statute issued by the Saudi Ministry of Education, schools implementing curricula other than Saudi ones are regarded as foreign schools. Foreign schools are further categorized as international schools who offer American or British curricula and community-based schools that teach national curricula of their home country and are run or sponsored by their respective diplomatic missions whereas being mostly owned by Saudi investors.

As of January 2015, the International Schools Consultancy (ISC) listed Saudi Arabia as having 203 international schools. ISC defines an 'international school' in the following terms "ISC includes an international school if the school delivers a curriculum to any combination of pre-school, primary or secondary students, wholly or partly in English outside an English-speaking country, or if a school in a country where English is one of the official languages, offers an English-medium curriculum other than the country's national curriculum and is international in its orientation." This definition is used by publications including The Economist.

In Saudi Arabia some international schools are owned by communities of foreign nationals, while others are private schools owned by individuals with Saudi citizenship.

The Saudi government limits community schools to one per locality or city per nationality; diplomatic missions either supervise or directly operate the community schools. These community schools are not required to separate male and female students into separate campuses and are allowed to host social activities with men and women mixed. They are not required to have Saudi citizens as sponsors since the Saudi authorities consider the schools to be under the sponsorship of the diplomatic missions. Czarina Valerie A. Regis and Allan B. de Guzman, authors of "A system within a system: the Philippine schools overseas," wrote that the Saudi Ministry of Education "still exercises restraint in implementing its regulatory functions" on community schools.

There may be more than one private school per nationality per city: the number of private schools that may be established is dependent upon the number of Saudi nationals willing to open a school in that city. Unlike community international schools, private international schools are required to follow Saudi regulations, including those related to gender segregation.

The British International School, Riyadh teaches from foundation one to high school. Over 80% of its students are British nationals, and the school follows the British curriculum.

International Schools Statute

The International Schools Regulations issued by the Ministry of Education, are:

Article 1

The following terms shall have the meanings assigned thereto:

International Schools: Schools using curricula other than the Saudi curricula.

Minister: Minister of Education

Ministry: Ministry of Education

Article 2

These Regulations shall regulate international schools of communities residing in the Kingdom so as to provide adequate education to children according to specific guidelines in a manner which enables them to pursue their education upon their return to their countries.

Article 3

The Ministry shall, through the relevant department, license and supervise international schools and their branches.

Article 4

International schools are private educational institutions which are financed by tuition fees, donations, and gifts.

Article 5

Saudi students may not be admitted to international schools. As an exception, the Minister may approve the admission of Saudi students arriving from abroad who have difficulties joining Saudi schools for a period to be assessed for each student on a yearly basis.

Article 6

A license for an international school shall be granted pursuant to the Minister’s approval upon the recommendation of the Supervisory Council provided for in Article 8 of these Regulations.

Article 7

Education at international schools shall be limited to pre-school, elementary, intermediate, and secondary stages, or their equivalent.

Article 8

A supervisory council shall be formed to oversee international schools. Said Council shall be chaired by the Minister and shall comprise the following members:

 The Deputy Minister of Interior
 The Deputy Minister of Foreign Affairs
 The Deputy Minister of Education
 The Deputy President of Girls’ Education

The Supervisor of International Schools at the Ministry shall be the secretary of the Council.

Article 9

The Supervisory Council shall set the instructions and rules required for the implementation of these Regulations, and shall in particular have the power to approve the following:

 Licensing rules and procedures.
 Applications for establishing international schools.
 Educational programs and curricula.
 Tuition fees.
 Donations and gifts granted to international schools.

The Council may consider an embassy’s request –referred thereto by the Ministry of Foreign Affairs– to purchase a school building or land for establishing a school thereon, based on the principle of reciprocity, subject to the following:

 The provisions of the Regulations.
 The land shall not be State-owned or allocated to an educational institution.
 The title of the land shall be registered, upon approval, under the name of the embassy, and shall only be used for the licensed purpose.

The Council shall decide on the embassy’s request within 30 days from the date of completion of all requirements and the request shall be referred to the Council of Ministers by the Ministry of Foreign Affairs. If the purpose for which the school was established ceases to exist or its license is revoked, the school shall be liquidated under the supervision of the Council in coordination with the relevant agencies.

Article 10

The Supervisory Council shall convene at least twice a year, and it may convene upon the call of its chairman or at the request of one of its members and the approval of the chairman.

Article 11

Each international school shall assume all aspects of school management, in addition to matters related to its level within the various educational and academic communities.

Article 12

Each international school shall have a board of directors to oversee its interests. Student parents shall be represented in the board, and the Ministry may attend its meetings.

Article 13

Each international school shall assign at least one hour a week for teaching basic Arabic, Islamic culture, and history and geography of the Kingdom.

Article 14

Each international school shall, prior to the beginning of each academic year, submit to the Supervisory Council an estimated annual budget in the Arabic language. Said budget shall include information on the school’s administrative, technical, and financial needs, as well as sources of funding.

Article 15

Each international school shall submit to the Supervisory Council an annual report on the workflow, budget implementation, and causes of violations and breaches, if any.

Article 16

A person violating the provisions of these Regulations or the decisions issued in implementation thereof shall be subject to one or more of the following penalties:

 A warning. 
 A fine not exceeding 50,000 riyals. 
 Revocation of license.

In all cases, the Minister may order the removal of the violation within a maximum period of two weeks from the date of notification.

Article 17

A committee shall be formed at the Ministry pursuant to a decision of the Minister, chaired by the Deputy Ministry and comprising the following members:

 A representative from the Ministry of Interior.  
 A representative from the Ministry of Foreign Affairs. 
 The Supervisor of International Schools at the Ministry. 
 A specialist in Sharia.

Said Committee shall investigate violations of these Regulations or the decisions issued in implementation thereof, and shall recommend appropriate penalties therefor.

Article 18

A penalty shall be imposed pursuant to a decision by the Minister upon recommendation of the Committee referred to in Article 17 of these Regulations. Penalty decisions imposing fines or providing for revocation of the license may be appealed before the Board of Grievances.

Article 19

An international school shall be liquidated under the supervision of the Ministry, and in coordination with the relevant agencies if the purpose for which the school was established ceases to exist or the license is revoked.

Article 20

International schools existing at the effective date of these Regulations shall adjust to conform with the provisions of these Regulations within 12 months from the date of entry into force.

Article 21

These Regulations shall be published in the Official Gazette, and shall enter into force 90 days from the date of publication thereof and shall repeal any conflicting provisions.

SEK International School Riyadh (under RCRC patronage)
The Ministry of Investment and the Royal Commission for Riyadh City (RCRC) announced on July 13, 2021 that they have partnered with SEK Education Group to open SEK International School Riyadh, its first campus in Saudi Arabia. The new international school will welcome students from Pre-K (age 3 years) to Grade 12 (age 17/18 years), and will become one of the few schools in Riyadh accredited to offer the International Baccalaureate (IB) Primary Years Programme (PYP), Middle Years Programme (MYP), and Diploma Programme (DP). 
SEK International School Riyadh will showcase the best of SEK International Schools: education innovation, a unique learning model, top ranked academic results, and a clear focus on the many challenges and opportunities the 21st century presents to all its students.

As a Spanish education group, SEK will provide all the students the opportunity of learning the Spanish language, as well as Arabic, in a multilingual, English-based environment.

This is the second international school for the SEK Education Group in the Middle East. SEK International Schools offer education to more than 6,000 students, of more than 70 nationalities, from four months to 18 years of age, in their campuses in Spain, France, Qatar and Ireland.

Philippine schools
As of February 2006 about 75% of the Philippine international schools represented by the Commission on Filipinos Overseas (CFO) were located in Saudi Arabia. Community-owned Philippine schools, including the International Philippine School in Al Khobar (IPSA), the International Philippine School in Jeddah (IPSJ), and International Philippine School in Riyadh (IPSR), were by 2006 managed by independent school boards but were initially managed by the diplomatic missions themselves. As of 2006 Riyadh has 13 Philippine private schools and Jeddah has five Philippine private schools.

Large numbers of Philippine children came to Saudi after many Filipino workers arrived in Saudi Arabia in the 1980s. The first Philippine school in Saudi Arabia, Philippine School in Jeddah was established after the Philippine Consulate in Jeddah began making efforts to start a school in 1983, and Philippine schools were later established in Riyadh and other Saudi cities. In 2000 Saudi Arabia had nine accredited Philippine schools. By 2005 Jeddah alone had four Philippine international schools, with two more scheduled to open shortly. By 2006 there were 21 Philippine schools recognized by the CFO, reflecting a 133% growth rate from 2000. Regis and Guzman stated that in private Philippine schools many Saudi rules that are not consistent with the culture of the Philippines are enforced.

Literacy
According to the results of the demographic survey conducted by the Department of Statistics and Information, Ministry of Economy and Planning in 2007 the incidence of illiteracy among the Saudi population was 13.7%. The illiteracy rate stood at 1.4% for the age group 10 to 14 years, while the highest level in the age group between the ages of 65 and more than 509,573 people to the rate of 73.9%. With regard to the spread of illiteracy among Saudi Administrative Regions, as the study showed a large disparity between the regions of the Kingdom, while the figure for both sexes was at its lowest level in the Riyadh region, at 9.9%, the highest level was found in the Jizan area at 23.5%, and the lowest rate of illiteracy among males was in Riyadh region, as the minimum rate of 5.1% and in Jizan higher rate of 14.8%, while the lowest rate of illiteracy of Saudi women was in the eastern region at 14.7% and the highest rate was in the region of Jizan at 31.6%.

According to the World Bank, there is gender disparity in the literacy rate. In 2007, 85.0 percent of adult (people ages 15 and above) were literate and 98.1 percent of youth (people ages 15 – 24) were literate, 89.1 percent of male adults were literate and 79.4 percent of female adults were literate. As for youth literacy rate (people ages 15 – 24), 97.0 percent were literate, 98.1 percent of male youths were literate, and 95.9 percent of female youths were literate.

One of the World Bank reports suggested the relatively high adult literacy rate of Saudi Arabia, considering the continued low level of primary enrollment, derived from the successful use of religious organizations, particularly local mosques and local religious institutions such as Koranic schools for the provision of ancillary educational services, which is a trend of particular note in the MENA region.

King Abdullah Project for General Education Development
The King Abdullah Project for General Education Development is a SR9 billion (US$2.4bn) project to be implemented over the next six years to create a skilled and work force for the future. A number of schools in Jeddah, Riyadh and Dammam have been selected for the implementation of this project. More than 400,000 teachers will be trained for the new program. In addition, this project will emphasize extracurricular activities for the purpose of developing intellectual, creative and communicative skills.

Criticism of the Saudi education system and reform proposals
The Saudi education system has been criticised. One observation was, "The country needs educated young Saudis with marketable skills and a capacity for innovation and entrepreneurship. That's not generally what Saudi Arabia's educational system delivers, steeped as it is in rote learning and religious instruction."

The study of Islam dominates the Saudi educational system. In particular, the memorization by rote of large parts of the Qu'ran, its interpretation and understanding (Tafsir) and the application of Islamic tradition to everyday life is at the core of the curriculum. Religion taught in this manner is also a compulsory subject for all university students. Saudi youth "generally lacks the education and technical skills the private sector needs". Indeed, such control has stifled critical thought, and as a result, the education system does not necessarily foster innovation and creativity, both of which are essential to development. Saudi education has also been strongly criticized for promoting intolerance, including anti-semitic views, anti-Christian rhetoric, and referring to non-Muslims as "infidels", enemies of God, and enemies of all Muslims.

The Islamic aspect of the Saudi national curriculum is examined in a 2006 report by Freedom House which concluded that "the Saudi public school religious curriculum continues to propagate an ideology of hate toward the 'unbeliever'. The Saudi religious studies curriculum is taught outside the Kingdom in madrasah throughout the world. Critics have described the education system as 'medieval' and that its primary goal "is to maintain the rule of absolute monarchy by casting it as the ordained protector of the faith, and that Islam is at war with other faiths and cultures".

The consequence of this approach is considered by many, including perhaps the Saudi government itself, to have encouraged Islamist terrorism. To tackle the twin problems of extremism and the inadequacy of the country's university education, the government is aiming to modernise the education system through the Tatweer reform program. The Tatweer program is reported to have a budget of approximately US$2 billion and focuses on moving teaching away from the traditional Saudi methods of memorization and rote learning towards encouraging students to analyze and problem-solve as well as creating a more secular and vocationally based education system.

A comprehensive Human Rights Watch review of the Education Ministry-produced school religion books for the 2016-17 school year found that some of the content that first provoked widespread controversy for violent and intolerant teachings in the aftermath of the September 11, 2001 attacks remains in the texts today, despite Saudi officials' promises to eliminate the intolerant language. The texts disparage Sufi and Shia religious practices and label Jews and Christians "unbelievers" with whom Muslims should not associate.

In 2021, The Washington Post newspaper published a report on the measures taken by Saudi Arabia to clean textbooks from paragraphs considered anti-Semitic and anti-women. The paragraphs dealing with the punishment of homosexuality or same-sex relations have been deleted, and expressions of admiration for the extremist martyrdom. Anti-Semitic expressions and calls to fight the Jews became fewer. David Weinberg, director of international affairs for the Anti-Defamation League in Washington, said that references to demonizing Jews, Christians and Shiites have been removed from some places or have toned down, noting the deletion of paragraphs that talk about killing gays, infidels and witches. The US State Department expressed in an email that it welcomed the changes to the materials affecting Saudi educational curricula. The Foreign Ministry supports a training program for Saudi teachers.

See also

 List of universities and colleges in Saudi Arabia
 Educational technology in Saudi Arabia
 Najd National Schools
 Youth in Saudi Arabia

References
 Mackey, Sandra. The Saudis: Inside the Desert Kingdom. Updated Edition. Norton Paperback. W.W. Norton and Company, New York. 2002 (first edition: 1987).  pbk.

Notes

External links